Each "article" in this category is a collection of entries about several stamp issuers, presented in alphabetical order. The entries are formulated on the micro model and so provide summary information about all known issuers.  

See the :Category:Compendium of postage stamp issuers page for details of the project.

Cilicia (French Occupation) 

French occupation issues of Turkish stamps with various overprints which all included CILICIE.

Dates 	1918–1921
Capital 	Adana
Currency 	40 paras = 1 piastre

Refer 	French Occupation Issues

CIS 

Refer 	Union of Soviet Socialist Republics (USSR)

Ciskei 

One of the territories ( Bantustans ) set up by the South African government as part of its apartheid policy.
Although the territory itself did not acquire international recognition, its stamps were
valid for postage.

Dates 	1981 – 1994
Capital 	Bhisho
Currency 	100 cents = 1 rand

Refer 	South African Territories

Cochin 

Cochin was a state of South India which merged with Travancore on 1 July 1949 to form Travancore–Cochin.
This in turn became the state of Kerala in 1956.

Dates 	1892–1949
Capital 	Ernakulam
Currency 	(1892) 6 puttans = 5 annas
		(1898) 12 pies = 1 anna; 16 annas = 1 rupee

Refer 	Indian Native States

See also 	Travancore–Cochin

Cochin-China
Stamps of France were introduced in 1862 when the region became a French colony.  On 17 October 1887, Cochin-China united with Cambodia, Annam and Tongking to form Indo-China.  Stamps of Indo-China were introduced in January 1889.  There were five Cochin-China stamps.  All were surcharged French Colonies Commerce types.  One (SG#3) was distinctive by an overprint of C.CH.  Cochin-China is now the southern part of Vietnam.
Dates
1886–1889
Capital
Saigon
Currency
100 centimes = 1 franc
Main article
Postage stamps and postal history of Cochin-China
See also
Annam & Tongking;
Indo-China Territories

Cocos (Keeling) Islands 

Discovered by Captain William Keeling in 1609, the islands were uninhabited until 1826.  They were annexed by Britain in 1857.  Administration was mainly by Singapore until 1955 when the islands were transferred
to Australia as a Dependent Territory.

Australian stamps were used 1955–1963 and again from 14 February 1966 to 8 July 1969 due to the introduction
of decimal currency.

Dates 	1963 –
Capital 	West Island
Currency  	(1963) 12 pence = 1 shilling; 20 shillings = 1 pound
		(1969) 100 cents = 1 dollar

Main Article
Postage stamps and postal history of the Cocos (Keeling) Islands

Coetivy 

Coëtivy Island is in the Indian Ocean south of the main Seychelles group.  A post office was opened
there in 1963.  It was administered by Britain as part of the Seychelles until 8 November 1965 when it was
included in British Indian Ocean Territory.  From 1976, Coetivy has been in the independent Seychelles and
uses stamps of Zil Elwannyen Sesel.

Refer 	Zil Elwannyen Sesel

Colombia 

Dates 	1859 –
Capital 	Bogotá
Currency 	100 centavos = 1 peso

Main Article
Postage stamps and postal history of Colombia

Colombian Territories 

Main Article 

Includes 	Antioquia;
		AVIANCA;
		Bolívar;
		Boyacá;
		Cauca;
		Cundinamarca;
		Granadine Confederation;
		LANSA;
		New Granada;
		Santander;
		Tolima

Commonwealth of Independent States (CIS) 

The CIS was founded in December 1991 at a meeting in Minsk of Russia, Belarus and Ukraine.  It was intended to be a commonwealth of Slav republics to ensure co-operation in defence, economics and foreign policy.  It was subsequently joined by all the other former Soviet states except Georgia and the three Baltic republics.

Stamps of the USSR continued to be used in the member states until each could introduce new types.
There have been no issues for the CIS as a whole.

Refer 	Union of Soviet Socialist Republics (USSR)

Comoro Islands 

An archipelago in the Indian Ocean, north west of Madagascar.  The four main islands are Anjouan,
Grande Comore (Great Comoro), Mayotte and Moheli.  Mayotte is politically a French overseas department,
while the others constitute the Comoros Republic.

The whole group came under French protection after 1841 and were separate colonies during 1891–1914.
In this period, each island issued French Colonial Tablet types inscribed with the island's name.
On 23 February 1914, they were attached to Madagascar as dependencies.  British forces captured the islands
from Vichy control in 1942 and, on 9 May 1946, they became collectively a French overseas department
called ARCHIPEL DES COMORES.

Stamps of Madagascar & Dependencies were used 1914–1950.  The first Comoros issue was on 15 May 1950.

Independence was declared on 6 July 1975 as the Comoros Republic, but this move was resisted in Mayotte
which continued to be part of France and now uses stamps of France.  Mayotte has a predominantly
Catholic population whereas the other three islands are mainly Muslim.

Dates 	1950 –
Capital 	Moroni (Grande Comore)
Currency 	100 centimes = 1 franc

Main Article
Postage stamps and postal history of the Comoros

Companhia do Nyassa 

Refer 	Nyassa

Confederate States of America 

The Confederacy was established by the southern U.S. states in February 1861 when they seceded from the Union. This precipitated the American Civil War which ended 9 April 1865 with the surrender of Robert E. Lee's army to that of Ulysses S. Grant.

The first Confederacy stamps were issued 18 October 1861.  There were four issues in all with values ranging from 2 to 20 cents.  All the stamps were definitive types with portraits of Jefferson Davis (Confederacy president) or of former Union presidents such as Washington, Jefferson, and Jackson.

Dates 	1861 – 1865
Capital 	Richmond (Virginia)
Currency 	100 cents = 1 dollar

See also 	United States of America (USA)

Congo (Indian UN Force) 

Stamps were issued to Indian military personnel with the United Nations force in the Congo.  These were
six values of the familiar Indian map type overprinted UN FORCE (INDIA) CONGO.

Dates 	1962 only
Currency 	100 naye paise = 1 rupee

Refer 	Indian Overseas Forces

Congo Free State 

A vast country in central Africa which was not fully explored by Europeans until the 1870s.  The missions, including those of Stanley and Livingstone, were partly financed by King Leopold II of Belgium who established the Congo Free State under his personal rule on 2 May 1885.

Stamps were issued from 1 January 1886 inscribed ETAT INDEPENDENT DU CONGO.

On 18 October 1908, the Congo was annexed by an Act of the Belgian parliament and renamed Belgian Congo (Congo Belge).  The first stamps with this inscription were issued on 1 January 1909.  In the meantime, stocks of Congo Free State stamps were overprinted CONGO BELGE.

Dates 	1886–1908
Capital 	Leopoldville
Currency 	100 centimes = 1 franc

Main Article 

See also 	Belgian Congo

Congo Republic 

Formerly Middle Congo.

Dates 	1959 –
Capital 	Brazzaville
Currency 	100 centimes = 1 franc

Main Article
Postage stamps and postal history of the Republic of the Congo

See also 	French Congo;
		French Equatorial Africa;
		Middle Congo

Congo Republic (Zaire) 

Formerly Belgian Congo and Zaire.

Dates 	1960–1971
Capital 	Kinshasa
Currency 	(1960) 100 centimes = 1 franc
		(1967) 100 sengi = 1 kuta; 100 kuta = 1 zaire

Refer 	Zaire

Constantinople 

A number of foreign post offices were established in Constantinople.  Most issued stamps of the home
country or general Levant types of that country.  There were overprinted local issues by the Italian,
Polish, Romanian and Russian offices.

Refer 	Constantinople (Italian Post Office);
		Constantinople (Polish Post Office);
		Constantinople (Romanian Post Office);
		Constantinople (Russian Post Office)

Constantinople (Italian Post Office) 

Dates 	1908–1923
Currency 	40 paras = 1 piastre

Refer 	Italian Post Offices in the Turkish Empire

Constantinople (Polish Post Office) 

Dates 	1919–1921
Currency 	100 fenigi = 1 mark

Refer 	Polish Post Abroad

Constantinople (Romanian Post Office) 

Dates 	1896–1919
Currency 	40 paras = 1 piastre

Refer 	Romanian Post Abroad

Constantinople (Russian Post Office) 

The office was open 1863–1918 and normally used stamps of Russia or Russian Levant.  There was an
individual overprint for Galata PO in Constantinople in 1909–10.

Dates 	1909–1910
Currency 	40 paras = 1 piastre

Refer 	Russian Post Offices in the Turkish Empire

Coo 

Refer 	Kos

Cook Islands 

Dates 	1892 –
Capital 	Avarua
Currency 	(1892) 12 pence = 1 shilling; 20 shillings = 1 pound
		(1967) 100 cents = 1 dollar

Main Article  Postage stamps and postal history of the Cook Islands

Includes 	Rarotonga

Córdoba 

Dates 	1858 only
Currency 	100 centavos = 1 peso fuerte

Refer 	Argentine Territories

Corfu (Italian Occupation) 

Italian occupation during brief dispute with Greece.  Italian stamps overprinted CORFU were prepared
but only a few had been introduced when evacuation took place.

Dates 	1923 only
Currency  	100 centesimi = 1 lira

Refer 	Italian Occupation Issues

See also 	Ionian Islands (Italian Occupation)

Corfu & Paxos (Italian Occupation) 

Italian occupation forces issued Greek stamps overprinted CORFU.  These were replaced by a general
issue for the whole of the Ionian Islands.

Dates 	1941 only
Currency  	100 lepta = 1 drachma (Greek)

Refer 	Italian Occupation Issues

See also 	Ionian Islands (Italian Occupation)

References

Bibliography
 Stanley Gibbons Ltd, Europe and Colonies 1970, Stanley Gibbons Ltd, 1969
 Stanley Gibbons Ltd, various catalogues
 Stuart Rossiter & John Flower, The Stamp Atlas, W H Smith, 1989
 XLCR Stamp Finder and Collector's Dictionary, Thomas Cliffe Ltd, c.1960

External links
 AskPhil – Glossary of Stamp Collecting Terms
 Encyclopaedia of Postal History

Cilicia